The premier division of Russian water polo organized by the FVPR (Federacijaa Vodnogo Polo Rossij / Russian Water Polo Federation). First held in 1992-93, it is currently contested by twelve teams. Spartak Volgograd is the most successful club with 12 titles since 1997, followed by Dynamo Moscow with 9.

Title holders 

 1992-93  CSKA Moscow
 1993-94  Dynamo Moscow
 1994-95  Dynamo Moscow
 1995-96  Dynamo Moscow
 1996-97  Spartak Volgograd
 1997-98  Dynamo Moscow
 1998-99  Spartak Volgograd
 1999-00  Dynamo Moscow
 2000-01  Dynamo Moscow
 2001-02  Dynamo Moscow
 2002-03  Spartak Volgograd
 2003-04  Spartak Volgograd
 2004-05  Shturm Ruza
 2005-06  Shturm Ruza
 2006-07  Sintez Kazan
 2007-08  Shturm Ruza
 2008-09  Shturm Ruza
 2009-10  Spartak Volgograd
 2010-11  Spartak Volgograd
 2011-12  Spartak Volgograd
 2012-13  Spartak Volgograd
 2013-14  Spartak Volgograd
 2014-15  Spartak Volgograd
 2015-16  Spartak Volgograd
 2016-17  Spartak Volgograd
 2017-18  Dynamo Moscow
 2018-19  Dynamo Moscow
 2019-20  Sintez Kazan
 2020-21  Sintez Kazan
 2021-22  Sintez Kazan

Titles by club

External links 
 Official site of FVPR
 Albo d'oro su Sports123.com

Rus
Water polo competitions in Russia
Water
Sports leagues established in 1992
National championships in Russia
Professional sports leagues in Russia